Bart Hubert Wilfried Marcel Staes (born 7 August 1958), is a Belgian politician who served as a Member of the European Parliament for Flanders from 1999 until 2019. He is a member of Groen, part of the European Greens. 

After studying in Brussels and qualifying as a teacher (Dutch/English/Economics), Staes turned to politics, beginning his political career in the Volksunie, which later became Spirit. Following the formation of the electoral alliance (cartel) between Spirit and the Socialistische Partij Anders (sp.a) in 2002, Staes moved to join Agalev (as it was then known; today, Groen). He has been a Member of the European Parliament continuously since 1999, at first for the Volksunie, later Spirit and now Groen. His particular interests are the environment and peace movements.

Political history 
His political career started with membership of the Volksunie, with the collapse of that party in 2002 he joined Groen!.

European Parliament 
Staes was first elected into the European Parliament in 1999 and was reelected, as only member from his party, in 2004 and 2009. During his time in parliament, he was part of The Greens–European Free Alliance transnational political group together with MEPs for the GreenLeft. He served on the Committee on Budgetary Control and the Committee on the Environment, Public Health and Food Safety.

Career
Politics Curriculum:
Member Party Council VolksunieJongeren (1980–1981) and (1984–1987)
Member of the VU-party-council (1984–1987) and (1995–2001)
Second follower VU-senate list (1995–1999)
Member Spirit-party presidency (2001–2002)
Mandatory of Agalev/Groen (July 2002 - )
Member of party council of Groen (2003 - )
Member of European parliament (1999 - )
Member of fraction Greens/European Free Alliance (Groenen/Europese Vrije Alliantie)
Member of Budget Control Commission
Instant member of Commission Environmental gestion, Public Health and Food security
Member of Parliamentary cooperative commission EU-Russia
Instant member of Parliamentary cooperative commission EU-Central-Asia
initiator of the Intergroup Chechnya
Author of manifesto from the Gravensteengroep
Publication Het vlees is zwak with Jaak Vandemeulebroucke, Hadewijch, Antwerp, 1996
Echo's voor een ander Europa, Houtekiet, Antwerp, 2004
Voor een ander Europa, Houtekiet, Antwerp, 2009
GGO's: Droom of werkelijkheid, Houtekiet, Antwerp, 2012

Timeline
13 June 1999 – :  Member of European Parliament

External links 

 

1958 births
Living people
People from Izegem
Groen (political party) MEPs
Groen (political party) politicians
MEPs for Belgium 1999–2004
MEPs for Belgium 2004–2009
MEPs for Belgium 2009–2014
MEPs for Belgium 2014–2019